Sämst klubb
Kaarinan Pojat (abbreviated KaaPo) is a football club from Kaarina in Finland.  The club was formed in 1932 and their home ground is at the Kaarinan urheilukenttä.  The men's football first team currently plays in the Kakkonen (Second Division).  The Chairman of KaaPo is Olli Tuominen.

Background

Kaarinan Pojat was established on 1 October 1958 having been initiated by a young teacher from Loimaa, Olavi Kuikka. The founding meeting was held at Ylikylä school and Pauli Hollmén was elected as chairman and Olavi Kuikka as secretary. The Executive Committee consisted of Heikki Hallikainen, Veikko Polari, Raimo Åkerblom, Arvi Kukkonen and Pertti Kottonen.

The club progressed from its early roots and in 1976 Keijo Lindroos brought greater professionalism to the team's training which was born out by promotion of the men's first team to Division 3 in 1979.  In 1991 the club gained promotion to the Kakkonen (Second Division) for the first time.

KaaPo have had two periods covering 18 seasons in the Kakkonen (Second Division), the third tier of Finnish football. The first spell was short-lived lasting just two seasons in 1992–93 but the second period has covered 16 consecutive seasons to date since 1995.

An important part of the club has been the development of the junior section since the 1960s which over the years has brought many moments of joy and success

Season to season

Club Structure

KaaPo currently has 1 men's teams, 2 ladies teams, 6 boys teams and 5 girls team.  The club organises various activities for its young players including group training and soccer schools.

References and sources
Official Website
Finnish Wikipedia
Suomen Cup
 Kaarinan Pojat Facebook

Footnotes

Football clubs in Finland
Kaarina
1932 establishments in Finland